Atherstone is a railway station serving the town of Atherstone in Warwickshire, England. It is on the Trent Valley section of the West Coast Main Line, exactly  from London Euston station.

History

The station was designed by John William Livock and opened by the London and North Western Railway in 1847. It was absorbed by the London Midland and Scottish Railway in the Grouping of 1923. The station passed to the London Midland Region of British Railways on nationalisation in 1948. When British Rail introduced sectorisation in the 1980s, the station was served by the Regional Railways Sector until the Privatisation of British Railways.

In 1860 there was a train crash at Atherstone that killed 10 people.

The Tudor style station building has been grade II listed since 1980. All of the stations on the Trent Valley Line originally had similar station buildings in the same style, designed by John William Livock, however the one at Atherstone is the only remaining example on the line, of an original Livock designed building on a station which is still open, as all the others have since been demolished and replaced. Other examples still exist at the closed  and  stations. The station building was restored in 1985. It has not been used for railway purposes since 1972, when the station became unstaffed, and is now in private ownership. It is currently used by a veterinary practice.

Services

The hourly service was introduced by the previous operating company London Midland in December 2008. Passenger use at the station has grown rapidly since the introduction of the new service. 

As a result, Atherstone lost its direct link with  but the journey time to/from London was cut by 30 minutes, with most trains now timetabled to take 82 minutes to reach the capital. However, a few trains do go via Northampton Monday - Sunday.

References

 
 
 
 Station on navigable O.S. map

External links

Atherstone
Railway stations in Warwickshire
DfT Category F2 stations
Former London and North Western Railway stations
Railway stations in Great Britain opened in 1847
Railway stations served by West Midlands Trains
1847 establishments in England
John William Livock buildings
Grade II listed railway stations
Stations on the West Coast Main Line